François Cappus  (16?? – Dijon, November 1716) was a French composer.

Early life
François Cappus was the son of legal counselor, Maitre Blaise Cappus, Bailiff for Parlement at Aix en Provence. He married Anne Hervelin (16?? - Dijon, March 1692). They were buried together in Saint-Etienne church of Dijon. The couple had three sons, among them the composer Jean Cappus, and three daughters.

Career
Shortly after his death, Cappus was referred to as a ‘good organist who had a healthy appetite, he died at a ripe old age’. He was also a singer at Dijon Cathedral, and was appointed to an official post in 1683 to ‘sing at all the
important events’.

Works
A dozen of his vocal compositions have survived,  sometimes erroneously attributed to his son Jean Cappus.

1693 
Air for 1 singer and continuo

Printemps, gardez-vous bien.

1694 
Six airs for 1 singer and continuo

Vous estes insensible au tourment,

Je meurs (bis) tous les jours,

Quand, pressé par l'excès,

Amour, avant que ma constance,

Taisez-vous (bis) tendres mouvements,

Que ces vastes forests solitaires.

Two airs

Que l'amour est charmant,  for three voices,

Quand le feu fait sentir, for one singer with a recitative for bass “air à boire”.

1699 
Four airs

Vous cachez avec soin vos peines,

Pour n'être point pilotte téméraire,

Reviens, affreux Hyver,

Que l'amour est charmant et doux, for three voices.

s.d. Air
 
Vous cachez avec soin vos peines, bergers…

1700 
Henrici Julii Borboni primi é Regio Sanguine principis laudes, Ballet
en deux parties, mêlé de chant

Three airs

Que Bacchus est charmant !,  air à boire

Voulez-vous savoir qui des deux,  air à boire

Le berger Tircis,  vaux-de-ville.

Notes

References 

Dunford, J., and Beuvard Y. (2017), "Jean (-Baptiste) Cappus – the forgotten violist: an inventory of his life and works", The Viola da Gamba Society Journal, vol. 11, pp. 46–64, 

1600s births
1716 deaths
French Baroque composers
French male classical composers
Musicians from Dijon
17th-century classical composers
Burials in France
17th-century male musicians